This is a list of the published works of Oscar Browning, teacher, historian and educationalist, whose active life extended from the mid-Victorian period to the 1920s.  The list is incomplete. As well as authoring numerous books, Browning edited and wrote prefaces to other works, and was a copious contributor of articles and reviews which appeared in a range of journals and newspapers, a sample of which are included here. The main source is the partial bibliography included in the 1956 edition of H.E. Wortham's biography.

Browning's main works were historical, but he also wrote on educational matters and literary biography, including a well-regarded Life of George Eliot. Late in life he completed two volumes of memoirs.

Works

History

Books
  
(Joint editor)   
 (later updated to 1885)  
  
(Editor)   
(Editor)   
(Editor)   
  
 (updated from 1878 edition)  
(Editor) 
  
}   
  
     
  
(Editor)   
 
  
(Introduction)  
  
  
  
   
(Preface)   
  ' 
(Editor)

Articles

Educational: books, pamphlets, articles
 
  

  
(Editor)   
 (booklet)

  (An address delivered at the Royal History Society, 22 October 1877, subsequently published together with a report of the conference on the teaching of history in schools) 
(Contributor)   

(Preface)   
(Co-editor)   
(Preface)

Literary works and memoirs
    
   
   
(Introduction)   
(Introduction)   
 Reproduced from an article in  Transactions of the Royal Society of Literature, volume XXII, 2nd series.

References

Bibliographies by writer
Bibliographies of British writers